Irene Angelina (c. 1181 – 27 August 1208) was a Byzantine princess and member of the Angelos dynasty and by her two marriages Queen of Sicily in 1193 and Queen of Germany from 1198 to 1208.

Life 
Irene was born in Constantinople, the second daughter of Byzantine emperor Isaac II Angelos and his first wife, quite possibly an unknown Palaiologina with a non-Greek mother, who became a nun with the name Irene. In 1193 her father and King Tancred of Sicily arranged Irene's marriage with Tancred's eldest son, Roger. Her husband was declared co-king, but he died on 24 December 1193, shortly before his father's death on 20 February 1194. Sicily was claimed by Tancred's aunt Constance and her husband, Emperor Henry VI. Irene was captured 29 December 1194 during the conquest of Sicily. She was married on 25 May 1197 to Henry's younger brother, Duke Philip of Swabia, and took the name Maria.

After the Emperor had died on September 28, Philip was elected King of the Romans in Mühlhausen on 8 March 1198. Queen Irene's father, who had been deposed in 1195, urged her to get Philip's support for his reinstatement; her brother, Alexius, subsequently spent some time at Philip's court during the preparations for the Fourth Crusade. She thus had an early influence on the eventual diversion of the Crusade to Constantinople in 1204. Rivalled by the Welf scion Otto IV, Philip was able to consolidate his rule over the German kingdom. On 21 June 1208, he was killed by the Bavarian Count Palatine Otto VIII of Wittelsbach, leaving Irene widowed a second time.

After the murder of her husband, Irene - who was pregnant at the time - retired to Hohenstaufen Castle. There, two months later on 27 August 1208, she gave birth to another daughter. Both mother and child died shortly afterwards. She was buried in the family mausoleum in the Staufen proprietary monastery of Lorch Abbey, along with her children. Her grave was destroyed and cannot be reconstructed.

Issue
Philip and Irene had:
 Beatrix (April/June 1198 – 11 August 1212), who married her father's rival, Emperor Otto IV on 22 July 1212 and died three weeks later without issue.
 Maria (1199/1200 – 29 March 1235), who married Duke Henry II of Brabant before 22 August 1215 and had issue.
 Kunigunde (February/March 1202 – 13 September 1248), who married King Wenceslaus I of Bohemia in 1224 and had issue.
 Elisabeth (March/May 1205 – 5 November 1235), who married King Ferdinand III of Castile on 30 November 1219 and had issue.
 Daughter (posthumously born and died 20/27 August 1208). She and her mother died following childbirth complications. 

Sources identified two short-lived sons, Reinald and Frederick, also born from the union of Philip and Irene-Maria Angelina, being both buried at Lorch Abbey alongside their mother. However, there were no contemporary sources who could ascertain their existence without doubt.

Legacy
In his poem on King Philip's Magdeburg Christmas celebrations, the minnesinger Walther von der Vogelweide described Irene as rose ane dorn, ein tube sunder gallen (Middle High German for "rose without a thorn, a dove without gall").

References

Sources 
O city of Byzantium: annals of Niketas Choniates tr. Harry J. Magoulias (Detroit: Wayne State University Press, 1984).
Bruno W. Häuptli: IRENE (Angelou) von Byzanz, in: Biographisch-Bibliographisches Kirchenlexikon (BBKL), vol. 28, Bautz, Nordhausen 2007, pp. 858–862.

External links 

Bibliography about Irene Angelina (in German) in OPAC Regesta Imperii. [retrieved 25 May 2014].

1180s births
1208 deaths
Year of birth uncertain
Irene
Hohenstaufen
Byzantine queens consort
Royal consorts of Sicily
German queens consort
Burgundian queens consort
Duchesses of Swabia
Deaths in childbirth
People from Constantinople
Hauteville family
Daughters of Byzantine emperors
12th-century German women
12th-century German nobility
12th-century Italian nobility
12th-century Italian women
12th-century Byzantine people
12th-century Byzantine women
Remarried royal consorts